The Paraguay expedition (1858–1859) was an American diplomatic mission and nineteen-ship squadron ordered by President James Buchanan to South America to demand redress for certain wrongs alleged to have been done by Paraguay, and seize its capital Asunción if it was refused.  The expedition was sent without an adequate investigation of the facts; most modern scholars have considered Buchanan's complaints were probably unjustified.  The real cause of the misunderstandings was that neither country had employed a competent diplomatic service.  Buchanan may have had an ulterior motive, such as to distract public opinion from the domestic concerns that afflicted his presidency.

At the time it was the largest naval squadron ever sent from the United States, and it caused a great impression in the Platine basin.  Even so, had it come to war, the strategic position of Paraguay in the heart of South America was strong.  Further, owing to shore-based administrative incompetence, the squadron had serious deficiencies.  Hence the expedition has been described as "woefully inadequate" for the job and "a military bluff carried off with commendable skill".  However, because of the conciliatory attitude of the U.S. diplomatic representative Judge James B. Bowlin — who to get an equitable resolution deviated from his instructions — and to the fact that Paraguay needed international friends, normal relations between the two countries were restored.  Until that happened, only one ship entered Paraguayan waters, by mutual agreement.

In financial terms, the expedition cost perhaps $3 million for which Paraguay paid $9,412 for the sake of peace and quiet.  Nevertheless Buchanan claimed a foreign policy success.  There was disinformation, some of whose effects persist to this day.

President Buchanan's complaints

In Buchanan's own words, the government of Paraguay had:-
"[S]eized and appropriated the property of American citizens residing in Paraguay, in a violent and arbitrary manner";
"upon frivolous and even insulting pretexts, refused to ratify the treaty of friendship, commerce and navigation";
"fired upon the United States steamer Water Witch ... and killed the sailor at the helm, while she was peacefully employed in surveying the Parana river".

The honor, as well as the interest of the United States, concluded Buchanan, demanded satisfaction.  In his first annual message to Congress (8 December 1857) he said he would make a demand for redress, "in a firm but conciliatory manner", but backed up by force if necessary.

On 2 June 1858 a joint resolution of Congress authorized the President to obtain satisfaction, using force if necessary."

The antecedents

The adventures of Edward A. Hopkins
Edward Anthony Hopkins was an adventurer who caused trouble with the government of Paraguay.  As will appear, insofar as a single person could be to blame for the Paraguayan debacle, that person was Hopkins.

A former midshipman in the U.S. Navy who had been court-martialled three times and dismissed from his squadron, he has been described as "undisciplined, imprudent, arrogant, aggressive", "unruly, quarrelsome, pugnacious, and arrogant", and "swaggering, bullying and tyranical".  According to yet another scholar,

His first appointment to Paraguay
In 1845 James Buchanan, at that time Secretary of State, needed to appoint a confidential agent to visit Paraguay, so he could determine whether it was worth granting diplomatic recognition.  The man Buchanan chose for the job was the 22-year old Edward A. Hopkins.  Despite his unpromising record, Hopkins got himself appointed, through family influence.

Hopkins had no diplomatic status.  His sole functions were to communicate American goodwill and to report the facts on the ground to the U.S. government.  He soon exceeded his remit, not only trying to mediate a longstanding dispute between Paraguay and Buenos Aires dictator Juan Manuel de Rosas — falsely claiming he had U.S. authorization to do it — but making wild and intemperate proposals.  When Rosas paid no attention, Hopkins wrote him a letter that was so insulting the United States felt constrained to apologize.  Hopkins was recalled.

His second appointment, and his rejection by Paraguay

Hopkins was a persuasive optimist. He persuaded prominent Rhode Island investors, including Governor Samuel G. Arnold, that Paraguay was an excellent business opportunity.  They incorporated the United States and Paraguay Navigation Company.  With a capital of $100,000, it would build and sail ships on the rivers of South America as well as conduct other business. Hopkins had himself appointed U.S. Consul in Paraguay, a diplomatic post he secured despite his calamitous record: he was the only applicant.  He assumed office in June 1853.  He was also the general agent of the Rhode Island company in Paraguay. 

The business venture of the United States and Paraguay Navigation Company was a failure.  Its main asset, a steamship loaded with machinery and merchandise, was shipwrecked well before it could get to Paraguay.  Salvaging the cargo as best as he could, Hopkins arrived in Paraguay and borrowed 11,500 pesos from its president, Carlos Antonio López. Hopkins started a sawmill and a cigar factory which — thanks to López — were allowed to operate on favorable terms, e.g. they were manned by cheap conscript labor.  The commercial viability of the venture entirely depended on the goodwill of López.

President López was an irascible, corpulent dictator; furthermore, a micromanager.  Even so, he is now acknowledged as one of Paraguay's better rulers — a modernizer.  López was gradually bringing Paraguay out of its long period of isolation. Because their country had an insecure history, Paraguayans were xenophobic and touchy.  In colonial times Paraguay had had to struggle against endemic Indian and Portuguese raids; after its independence, with Brazilian and Buenos Aires bullying.

Dealing with López called for diplomatic tact and patience; yet the man entrusted with the task was Edward A. Hopkins, whose arrogance began to irritate the President.  Hopkins "made no secret of his mission to 'civilize' Paraguay".  Thus, according to John Hoyt Williams, he asked to be made an admiral in the Paraguayan navy.  He would build a ship to his own design.  He and a crew of Americans would sail the ship to Buenos Aires and kidnap dictator Rosas.  "All he needed was 100,000 pesos."  López was not impressed.

One day Hopkins' brother and the wife of the French consul were out riding in the countryside when they encountered three Paraguayan soldiers herding cattle.  The soldier in charge ordered the couple to move aside so as not to frighten the animals, but he was ignored and the cattle stampeded.  Enraged, the soldier struck Hopkins' brother with the flat of his sword.  Whereupon, wrote Professor Ynsfran   A different source found that Hopkins boasted that he "forcibly entered the audience chamber of President López, in his riding dress, whip in hand, despite the remonstrance of the guard".

Hopkins made it worse.  Even though López had ordered the soldier to receive 300 lashes for exceeding his authority, Hopkins demanded that Paraguay apologise in its official newspaper.  A different source — a resident Spanish journalist — wrote that Hopkins had demanded that the soldier be shot, but he was only sentenced to a spell in jail.

Hopkins possessed certain documents which he was supposed to deliver up before leaving the country.  He refused, and in defiance of López was conveyed out of Paraguay aboard a visiting American vessel USS Water Witch.  An infuriated López banned all foreign warships from entering Paraguayan waters.  This incident, and the role of Water Witch in further exacerbating American-Paraguayan relations, will be described later.

The claims of the Rhode Island company
Back in the United States the company that Hopkins represented got up a claim against Paraguay.  This claim was afterwards adjudicated, see below, by a two-person international commission comprising an American and a Paraguayan arbitrator.  The arbitrators agreed that the Rhode Island company's claim was worthless.  However, this was not determined until August 1860.  Meantime, the Rhode Island company got up a campaign. It asserted that it had been wronged and damaged by the Republic of Paraguay to an amount in excess of a million dollars.  It was in reference to this claim that President Buchanan said Paraguay had "seized and appropriated the property of American citizens residing in Paraguay, in a violent and arbitrary manner".

Summary
The claim by the Rhode Island company that they were arbitrarily ruined by the Paraguayan government, later adjudicated as worthless, was, therefore, one of the three official causes for sending the Paraguay expedition.

Refusing to ratify the friendship treaty
Paraguay had a history of feeling disrespected by its larger neighbors Brazil and Argentina` and welcomed recognition by third countries.  Recently, in 1853, Paraguay had negotiated treaties of friendship, commerce and navigation with Great Britain, France, Sardinia and the United States, and looked forward to the ratification of the latter by the U.S. Senate.  These four treaties were almost word-for-word the same, and contained most favored nation clauses.

Owing to the carelessness of a visiting American diplomat, many formal mistakes got into the wording of the U.S.-Paraguay treaty, e.g. the U.S.A. was referred to as "United States of North America"; so the U.S. Senate required these be corrected.  A corrected version was prepared for Paraguay to ratify. By the time the document arrived in South America consul Hopkins had departed, and no American diplomat was available to formally present it to the Paraguayan government.  So the responsibility was given to Lieutenant Thomas Jefferson Page, commander of USS Water Witch

Following the Hopkins incident in which he was conveyed out of Paraguay by USS Water Witch (September 1854), an angry President López was in no mood to ratify, and Water Witch had been banned from Paraguayan waters.  Lieutenant Page sent an officer to Asunción by commercial steamer to hand-deliver the corrected version of the treaty.  However, an upset Paraguayan government refused to receive it because it was not in Spanish.

Summary
Buchanan complained Paraguay refused to ratify the treaty "on frivolous and even insulting pretexts".  But strictly speaking Paraguay was not bound to ratify a document not in its national language; more to the point, it was not bound to ratify a treaty of friendship at all; still less, if there was not friendship enough.  The upshot, however, was that while France, Great Britain and Sardinia had gained commercial and navigation advantages, the United States had yet to do so.

That, then, was another of the three reasons Buchanan gave for sending the Paraguay expedition.

USS Water Witch

Water Witch was a ship of the United States Navy that explored the rivers of the River Plate basin.  These rivers drain an area of land equal to one-fourth of the surface of South America.  Amongst the most important are the Paraná River and the Paraguay River.  They are accessible through Argentine territory.

In 1852 dictator Rosas — who used to block access to them — was overthrown and his successor Justo José de Urquiza opened the rivers of Argentina to free navigation by the ships of all nations.  The United States therefore decided to send Water Witch on an expedition of scientific exploration, intended to encourage commerce and enhance American prestige.

USS Water Witch was the best vessel for this role.  Launched in 1852, she had a wooden hull 150 foot long, a 22-foot beam, and drew only 7 feet 10 inches, important for navigating rivers that were liable to shoal.  She carried an experimental propulsion system (Morgan eccentric feathering paddle wheels).  Rigged as a topsail schooner, she was armed with three small bronze howitzers.

She was commanded by Lieutenant Thomas Jefferson Page USN, who afterward wrote an accessible account of her voyages.  Born into one of the First Families of Virginia, his grandfather had signed the Declaration of Independence.  However, Page was wanting in tact, and was no diplomat. In touchy Paraguay misunderstandings could occur, yet according to the southern gentleman honor code, insult literally could not be tolerated.

President López welcomes USS Water Witch 

Water Witch arrived at Asunción in October 1853.  At this time consul Hopkins had only been in Paraguay a few months and was still on good terms with President López.

Lieutenant Page wrote that López received them very well, concluding  Since Paraguay sought American friendship, it was understandable.

First dent in American-Paraguayan relations
Page wanted to take Water Witch up the Paraguay River into the Mato Grosso, owned by Brazil, and applied to López for permission.  However, there was a highly sensitive political situation that Page did not fully understand:

Paraguay had a tense relationship with the Empire of Brazil; the two countries had a 300-year old, shifting boundary dispute going back deep into colonial times.  Where Paraguay ended and Brazil began was strongly disputed, and had led to firefights. Paraguay considered that Brazilian settlers from the Mato Grosso were continually encroaching into and appropriating Paraguayan territory, yet López could not persuade Brazil to sign a definitive boundary agreement.  He felt very bitter about this.  López feared to make a precedent whereby Brazil would demand the right to navigate via the River Paraguay into the Mato Grosso.What was really at issue was Lopez's fears that free navigation would lead to an enormous Brazilian buildup in the Mato Grosso which would threaten Paraguay militarily, and, through its commercial impact on the North, would especially increase smuggling. It would seem that López had an almost morbid premonition that formal war with Brazil was on the cards..

Accordingly, López issued Lieutenant Page with a passport to explore the Paraguay River up to a certain point, but no further.  When Water Witch arrived there, however, Page persuaded himself he could ignore López's prohibition and he pushed on deep into Brazilian territory.  Scientifically, this was interesting; politically, reckless.  Page established his 450 ton ship could steam up to Corumbá in the Mato Grosso,  from Buenos Aires, further than had ever been done before; his achievement opened up the Mato Grosso to steam navigation (far and away the best means of access to the province); but he upset López. Although López tried to be polite about it, it was a dent in American-Paraguayan relations. López no longer trusted Page.

Edward Hopkins again; Water Witch trains her guns on the presidential palace
In September 1854 President López informed Lieutenant Page that Edward Hopkins was no longer accepted as U.S. Consul in Paraguay.  The Rhode Island company could send another representative and that would be fine, but Paraguay would have no more dealings with Hopkins. 

As mentioned, Hopkins had in his possession certain papers he was supposed to deliver up and López refused to let him leave the country until he did so.  Lieutenant Page, although he had a very poor opinion of Hopkins, decided he ought to help a fellow American, and applied for the necessary permits.  However, the Paraguayan government and Page got into a prickly dispute about the paperwork, the government insisting all applications had to be made in Spanish, which language Page refused to use.  So Page defied López and removed Hopkins from Paraguay anyway in USS Water Witch.  This raised López's animosity, since the implication was that Water Witch, a guest of Paraguay, was prepared to fight its way out of the country to remove a person defying the Paraguayan government.  More than one source claims that Water Witch trained her guns on the presidential palace. A furious López responded by banning all foreign vessels of war from Paraguayan waters.  (It was why he refused to ratify the U.S.-Paraguay treaty of friendship, above).

Fort Itapirú fires on USS Water Witch

In January 1855, while Water Witch was in Argentine waters, Lieutenant Page led off a small expedition to explore an Argentine river, leaving his executive officer, Lieutenant William Nicholson Jeffers, in charge of the ship, with orders to explore the Upper Paraná river.

The Upper Paraná flows west until it encounters the Paraguay River, when it turns south and is called the Lower Paraná.  The Upper Paraná — which Jeffers was to explore —  was (and is) is the international boundary between Argentina and Paraguay, and at that time was at least two miles wide.

A few miles upstream the Upper Paraná there was a long island called Carayá that divided the river into two channels. The southern channel was international, but so far as Paraguay was concerned the northern channel, called the Canal Privado was in Paraguayan territorial waters, was indeed a sensitive military zone.  The reason was that, mostly, the Paraguayan coast was swampy and not easily invaded, but an exception occurred around the village of Paso de Patria, where there was a firm beach where a landing could be made.  This vulnerable spot was defended by a military camp at Paso de Patria, and the entrance to the channel was protected by a Paraguayan fort called Itapirú.  The map, drawn by colonel George Thompson of the Paraguayan army just few years later, shows the scene.

Itapirú was only a small semicircular brick fort, but it had six large cannon, and its gunners were accurate. Ten years later, in the War of the Triple Alliance, the fort defied a strong Brazilian naval force for 40 days.  

On 1 February 1855 USS Water Witch, Lieutenant Jeffers, carrying an Argentine pilot, approached Fort Itapirú where it guarded the Canal Privado. He must have known he was risking confrontation, because he moved the starboard gun to the port side, cleared for action, and ordered forty shrapnel, twelve regular shells, and thirty stand of grape prepared.  He knew López had banned foreign warships from Paraguayan waters — with Water Witch in mind — and he was carrying a pilot who knew the river.  His excuse was that he had tried to go through the main channel but had run on a sandbar. One source says the move was probably a calculated insult to López.

At about 1:20 pm the fort sent a Paraguayan canoe alongside and a man offered Jeffers a copy of López's decree banning foreign vessels.  Jeffers refused to accept it on the ground that it was in Spanish.  Jeffers did this, not because there was nobody on board who knew Spanish — there was  — but in retaliation for Paraguay's earlier refusal to receive the friendship treaty in English.  Thus Jeffers was navigating in waters claimed by Paraguay while refusing to communicate with its officials.  When within 300 yards of the fort Jeffers received a hail in Spanish. "Not understanding", he continued.

According to Jeffers, the fort then fired two blank shots, followed by a live round.  The live shot killed the helmsman, Samuel Chaney.  Water Witch retaliated with her three howitzers.  His way ahead uncertain because of a risk of grounding, Jeffers reversed course and ran the gauntlet again.  The fort hulled Water Witch ten times, destroyed two boats and damaged a paddle wheel.  Water Witch limped into an Argentine port.

When Lieutenant Page found out about it he went downriver and tried to persuade Commodore William D. Salter, commander of the U.S. squadron in South America, to give him orders to attack the fort.  Salter refused, and referred it to Washington.

Assessment
Back in the U.S., Lieutenant Page claimed the Paraguayan fort had fired at Water Witch without provocation while she was in international waters.  Lieutenant Jeffers claimed he was never in the Canal Privado.  Modern scholars have not been persuaded, and neither was Secretary of State William L. Marcy, who found Page and Jeffers directly responsible for the Water Witch incident.  (In late 1856 the U.S. sent special agent Richard Fitzpatrick to Paraguay to try to get the friendship treaty ratified, without even mentioning Water Witch; he was rebuffed).

In any case, the incident was provoked by a junior naval officer who should have known he was risking armed confrontation with a fort under orders to interdict foreign vessels, and with which he refused to parley.  President Buchanan claimed that López's navigation prohibition did not apply to USS Water Witch because she was not a vessel of war, just a scientific research vessel, ignoring that USS Water Witch came to the fort stripped for action with her ammunition on deck.

Summary
That the Paraguayan fort had fired on Water Witch without justification may seem improbable in light of the above.  This, then, was the other of the three official causes for sending the Paraguay expedition.

Incompetent diplomacy
In less than six months an accumulation of diplomatic altercations had produced a full-fledged dispute that would almost to lead to war.  In summary, the sequence of mistakes leading to the breakdown in relations was: (1) a diplomat failing to proof-read an international treaty; (2) while a guest of Paraguay and in defiance of its government, insensitively steaming into Brazil; (3) the inappropriate behavior of consul Hopkins; (4) defiantly taking Hopkins and documents away in an U.S. warship; (5) using Lieutenant Page in the sensitive matter of the unratified treaty; (6) defying Fort Itapirú.   These things might have been avoided if both sides had had a competent diplomatic service to untangle misunderstandings in good time, but they did not.

Paraguay
López has been described as "an egotist who refused to maintain an adequate diplomatic service".  Paraguay had a minister of foreign relations in Asunción, but he was a mere figurehead: López did not even allow his foreign ministers to open diplomatic correspondence. López had no representatives abroad "and did not care to get information about the outside world".

United States
At that time there was no professional Foreign Service. Congress begrudged the cost of the diplomatic establishment.    Until 1856, appointments in the American diplomatic and consular services were unsalaried; therefore, the financial incentive to apply for a post (if any) was the opportunity to make money in a foreign country.  Diplomatic and consular appointments were made on the spoils system; too often, the quality was poor.  In Latin America the U.S. was represented in some countries, not in others. 

Until consul Hopkins arrived the United States did not have any kind of representation in Asunción.  When it had needed to, it sent a diplomat from Buenos Aires.  The quality of this part-time representation could be poor.  The mistakes that got into the U.S.-Paraguay treaty of friendship did so because of the carelessness of one of those visitors, who cannot have proof-read the document. Hopkins, the first U.S. consul, got the post because nobody else applied.  After he left the job of representing America was given to Lieutenant Page, effectively a persona non grata in Paraguay, who was anyway a junior naval officer with no diplomatic aptitude.  In one assessment, "The dispatch of a strong American task force to bring Paraguay to book was the culmination of fifteen years of diplomatic futility".

President Buchanan's motives
There was no public pressure for action against Paraguay; newspaper coverage was sparse and, if anything, adverse to Hopkins and Page.  The Water Witch incident was almost forgotten in public consciousness when, three years later, it was suddenly revived by President Buchanan in his first annual message to Congress.

It is not certain that Buchanan himself believed his complaints were valid.  He personally knew something about Hopkins' track record; he presumably knew that Secretary of State Marcy had thought Lieutenant Jeffers was probably to blame for the Fort Itapirú incident; and it could be guessed why President López might be unwilling to ratify a treaty of friendship.  Yet the Paraguay expedition was despatched "without bothering about a real investigation of the rather complicated antecedents of the trouble".  Several authors have thought Buchanan had an ulterior motive.  "The reason for the sending of the expedition plainly lies outside the scope of American-Paraguayan relations".

One theory is that Buchanan sent the Paraguay expedition to distract American public opinion from the domestic problems that plagued his presidency.  "Stymied on the domestic front, Buchanan looked to the foreign policy area...  President Buchanan hoped to restore national unity by sending a large fleet to Paraguay to gain redress for alleged wrongs done to American honor.  That did not occur and the nation ultimately descended into a brutal civil war.   Another interpretation is that Buchanan wanted to demonstrate that "the United States had the will and the power to enforce the Monroe Doctrine".  Still another is that the expedition was sent for a wider purpose, the protection of American commerce in that part of the world.

The Republican Congressional Committee — Buchanan's opponents — claimed that "Mr Buchanan's war on Paraguay was not for glory, but to furnish means of corruption". They said the Paraguay expedition was an opportunity to dispense political patronage; several examples were given.

The expedition
The Paraguay expedition consisted of two functions: the naval force, and an accompanying diplomatic mission.

The naval arm

Up to that time it was the largest naval expedition ever to leave the United States.  It accounted for 25% of the Navy's personnel and operational vessels.

These ships carried 200 guns and 2,500 men.

Most of the American fleet drew too much water to ascend the rivers.  Therefore, the United States chartered seven commercial steamers and adapted them as naval vessels.  The charters gave the United States the option to buy them outright, which it did.  In the table they are denoted by an asterisk.

The diplomatic arm, and its instructions
President Buchanan appointed a diplomat to accompany the expedition.  He was Judge James Butler Bowlin, a prominent and well-respected St Louis politician with "a reputation as a forceful, no-nonsense diplomat".

Bowlin was instructed to demand:

"an apology for the attack upon the Water Witch" ;
"an apology for the rude and offensive manner in which Commander Page's proposition for an exchange of the ratifications of the Treaty was received, and for the rejection of that of Mr Fitzpatrick upon the grounds alleged"; 
"an indemnification of not less than five thousand dollars to be paid to the representatives of the seaman who was killed upon the occasion"; and 
"a suitable indemnification in behalf of the United States and Paraguay Company for their losses and damages in consequence of the treatment of the servants of that Company by the Paraguayan government".

As to the last point, Bowlin was not to accept less than $500,000.  If, however, Paraguay would not pay even that, the claim was to go to international arbitration.  "An indispensable preliminary, however, to this adjustment, will, of course, be an acknowledgment on the part of the Paraguayan government of its liability to the Company".  In other words, the arbitrators were to assume Paraguay was liable; their sole function was to determine the monetary amount.

The military challenge

Should Bowlin be unable to achieve an agreement with Paraguay on these issues, he was to turn matters over to Commodore Shubrick.  Then Shubrick was to:-

Blockade the Paraguay River to prevent commerce.
Attack and destroy the Paraguayan Fortress of Humaitá.
Proceed to the capital Asunción and capture it by force if necessary.

Shubrick could have blockaded Paraguay, but the rest of his orders may not have been feasible for any naval force of the wooden-warship era. Paraguay lay in the heart of South America and had to be approached — and if necessary, fought — through tricky rivers, requiring the skills of a brown-water navy.  It was by no means easy to capture and destroy the Fortress of Humaitá.  "A hard nut to crack", it was afterwards known as the Gibraltar of South America. Its batteries had furnaces for making cannonballs red hot.  While not an exact parallel, in the subsequent War of the Triple Alliance (1864-1870) it took a combined Brazilian-Argentine force more than two years, incurring major casualties; and, unlike Commodore Shubrick, the allies had ironclad warships and a large siege army with logistical support. 

For hostile vessels, even the river approach to Humaitá was dangerous.

One scholarly assessment is that Shubrick's warlike resources were "woefully inadequate" for the job.

As for capturing Asunción, the allies in the War of the Triple Aliance were to do it in January 1869, but they had large armies and incurred very large casualties.  The Paraguayans fought fanatically, losing (on a cautious estimate) between one fourth and one half of their population.

If Shubrick had blockaded Paraguay, it would have been financially inconvenient for that country, but not disastrous, because Paraguay was self-sufficient. Previously, Paraguay had for years defied dictator Manuel de Rosas of Buenos Aires (1835-1852) when he had tried to do the same.

Approach to Asunción
Units of the expedition began arriving in Montevideo, Uruguay in December 1858.  It caused intense alarm in the region.

Judge Bowlin, however, appreciated it was essential to convey America's peaceful intentions.  To do that, he wrote, the diplomatic mission intended to go up to Paraguay in USS Fulton alone, other U.S. vessels to go no further than Corrientes, Argentina.  Maybe Paraguay would object to Fulton entering its territorial waters, in which case they would travel on a Paraguayan steamer, for "I am resolved to have no controversy with them on so immaterial a point". 

The larger ships remained in Montevideo while the lighter vessels went up the Paraná River, where all of them ran aground more than once and had to be extricated by the revenue cutter Harriet Lane, on loan from New York Harbor, and named after Buchanan's niece.  Some stopped at Rosario, Argentina, while others steamed up to the town of Paraná.  At that time the small town was capital of the Argentine Confederation, because the State of Buenos Aires had seceded.   There they met Justo José de Urquiza, president of the Argentine Confederation.

General Urquiza had major problems of his own.  His cash-strapped Argentine Confederation was struggling with the State of Buenos Aires, which had successfully bribed his navy to defect.  He had good relations with López of Paraguay, and wanted to keep it that way, because he hoped for an alliance against Buenos Aires. Conversely, Buenos Aires hated López, so American aggression would suit them well, wrote Bowlin. Urquiza decided to try his utmost to persuade López to come to a friendly settlement with Commissioner Bowlin, and went to Asunción himself, preceding the Americans.

As Judge Bowlin got nearer to the Paraguayan capital his sense of fairness and deepening knowledge led to him to become increasingly skeptical about the Rhode Island company's claim.  

As planned, no American vessels went further than Corrientes, Argentina, except USS Fulton, which steamed on to Paraguay. Fulton carried Commodore Shubrick, Commissioner Bowlin, and secretary and interpreter Sam Ward.   (After the parties came to terms, Water Witch was invited up to Asunción.)

The Fortress of Humaitá was a few miles up the mouth of the Paraguay River, and Fulton approached it with caution.   They came to the Londres battery.  According to one account,

Sixteen ominous apertures pointed their gloom, and whatever else they may contain, upon us; and, like the eyes of the figure in the picture, seemed to follow the vessel’s motion, with a precision that is not always agreeable under similar circumstances. These apertures are those of the casemate battery, constructed of brick, but very deep, and defended by the very formidable battery of sixteen eight-inch guns... To the left of the casemate we discovered a more substantial structure, viz.: twenty-five gun battery of thirty-two and twenty-four pounders, besides two eight-inch. Spacious barracks showed that no mean force defended the place, and though there was neither the disturbance nor the disorder of men rushing to their guns, or forming battalions, I occasionally caught a glimpse of the mass that awaited in the rear the ordeal through which we were passing. None of the batteries were manned except the casemate, whose large guns were prepared for the destruction they might well occasion.

To a hail from the shore, the USS Fulton came to anchor, and despatched a boat saying she was Fulton, an American naval vessel bound to Asunción with a United States Commissioner on board.  They asked if there was any objection to the Fulton proceeding on her course.  A pacific answer was shortly received.  Fulton arrived at the Paraguayan capital on 24 January 1859,  from the sea.

Negotiations

By now López understood the Americans came in a conciliatory spirit, and they were received respectfully.   While López knew a blockade would cause Paraguay some financial loss, he thought it could not last for long because America was about to descend into civil war.  He was not intimidated.  However, López had his troubles with Brazil, and did not need another enemy.  If he could do it with dignity, he wanted a treaty of friendship with America, and Bowlin was offering him one.  A form of words could be found — and was found — to save face over the Water Witch incident.

The stumbling block was the claim by the Rhode Island company.  López was prepared to pay up to $250,000 to get rid of it, but Bowlin's instructions did not allow him to settle for under $500,000.  However, by now Bowlin was convinced the claim was worthless, and he persuaded López that, if he went to arbitration, Paraguay would do well.  He offered to testify for Paraguay in person. Commodore Shubrick even gave López the name of a top American lawyer.

Bowlin's secretary and translator was Sam Ward, a brother of poet Julia Ward Howe.   Sam, an accomplished bon viveur, was later famous as the "King of the Lobby".  At that time Ward was in straitened financial circumstances, but he soon changed all that by making a private deal with President López.   Ward was to lobby in Washington to get the treaty ratified, and he was to get himself appointed secretary to the arbitration commission and use his influence to get its award as far as possible below $500,000.  For the first service Ward was to get a lump sum; for the second, a 2% commission on any amount Paraguay saved.  A later scholar wrote that the Rhode Island company figured out Ward had been bribed, and tried to outbribe him.  However, the corruption of Sam Ward probably made little difference in the end.

There was a serious last-minute snag in the negotiations which, however, was smoothed over, possibly with a little creative bending of Bowlin's mandate.

The settlement

Commissioner Bowling and President López came to a settlement, as follows.

A form of words was found to save face over the incident of Water Watch and the fort. The government of Paraguay did not admit it was to blame, saying the fort was only obeying standing orders, there being no intent to insult the American flag.  However Paraguay deplored the incident had happened because it was open to misinterpretation.
Paraguay quietly sent a draft for 10,000 pesos for the helmsman's family.
Paraguay said that, in refusing to ratify the friendship treaty, it had nothing to apologize for. It had wanted a treaty with America all along. The mistakes that prevented Paraguay from ratifying were the fault of American representatives.
A virtually identical treaty — in English and Spanish — was signed, ratified by Paraguay promptly, and sent to Washington for ratification.
The Rhode Island company's claim was to be adjudicated by an international commission comprising two arbitrators, one American, the other Paraguayan. If the arbitrators could not agree, a neutral umpire was to decide it.
The arbitrators were to have a free hand: they could award any sum, including nothing at all. (This was not stated explicitly, but subtle language in the Arbitration Convention allowed it.)

In agreeing this settlement, particularly the last point, Bowlin undoubtedly deviated from his instructions. One scholar wrote that since Bowlin was a lawyer he must have known what he was doing, but it is not necessarily so.

USS Fulton left Asunción on 13 February 1859.

Aftermath

Military assessment
The Paraguay expedition revealed worrying deficiencies in the antebellum Navy, not because of the officers and men, but owing to incompetent shore-based administration, fueled by inadequate naval budgets.  Wrote one scholar:

It was fortunate indeed that the American legation accomplished an acceptable settlement with the swiftness that they did. The serious vulnerability of the Squadron did not become known to the Paraguayans; and the military bluff of the Commodore and Commissioner was carried off with commendable skill. The Squadron was not faced with a test of its offensive power; in the event military action had become necessary, it is unlikely that the naval force could have accomplished its mission with much success.

Deficiencies
There was a critical shortage of munitions and ordnance: they would have supported a 7-hour bombardment, but not more.  There were not enough small arms cartridges.  The largest siege weapon — the 11-inch Dahlgren gun — could not have been used.  In one assessment, the Paraguay expedition, if the negotiations had failed "would not have [had] any blockade or other military capability".

There were serious problems in the supply of coal for the steamers.

Seven merchant steamers were chartered, repaired at Navy yards and converted into naval vessels, with an option to buy them (which was exercised).  In use, they were assessed unfit as war vessels:

The flagship USS Sabine was nearly lost in a bad storm, being on her beam ends for five hours.  Shubrick blamed a badly repaired tiller and substandard gun ports which had splintered.

The international arbitration: zero damages
For the international arbitral commission Paraguay hired James Mandeville Carlisle, a clever and distinguished lawyer who argued more cases before the Supreme Court than any other counsel of his time.  He had been recommended to President López by Commodore Shubrick himself, which suggests Shubrick wanted Paraguay to win.

President Buchanan appointed his old friend Judge Cave Johnson of Tennessee as one arbitrator, and President López appointed José Berges as the other.  José Berges knew that Sam Ward, the commission's secretary, was on the Paraguayan payroll, for they had traveled to London together where he had paid Ward with his own hands.

  Judge Cave Johnson.  Formerly a Postmaster General, he had introduced the postage stamp.
  José Bergés.  Paraguay's minister of Foreign Affairs, he was later shot for treason.

The theory for the claimants was that they were doing well in Paraguay until López became jealous of their success and decided to ruin them.  The arbitrators rejected this as absurd.  It was the arrogant behavior of Hopkins that was their ruin, neither were they doing very well.  Their award (13 August 1860) was as follows: 
That the said claimants,"The United States and Paraguay Navigation Company", have not proved or established any right to damages upon their said claim against the Government of the Republic of Paraguay; and that, upon the [evidence], the said government is not responsible to the said company in any damages or pecuniary compensation whatever, in all the premises. In his detailed reasons Cave Johnson alluded to the "enormous, if not criminal exaggeration of the demands of this company".  Hence the company, which could have got $250,000 if Bowlin had had a free hand, received nothing.

Cost of the expedition
The Paraguay expedition cost perhaps $3 million. The cost of chartering and refitting the steamers and supplying them with coal and stores alone amounted to $486,256.57.

Disinformation
In his memoirs President Buchanan said his administration's foreign policy met with "great and uncommon success", instancing the Paraguay expedition.  Exaggerating the extent to which U.S. ships approached Asunción, he claimed Paraguay issued "ample apologies", even though Paraguay had not apologized at all.  He mentioned that Paraguay paid $10,000 for the deceased helmsman, but not that his administration had demanded $500,000 minimum for the Rhode Island company, which got nothing.  As for the costs of the expedition,

It is a remarkable fact in our history, that its entire expenses were defrayed out of the ordinary appropriations for the naval service. Not a dollar was appropriated by Congress for this purpose, unless we may except the sum of $289,000 for the purchase of seven small steamers of light draft, worth more than their cost, and which were afterwards usefully employed in the ordinary naval service.The Republican Congressional Committee riposted that "The expense of the naval service of Mr. Buchanan's past two years is almost twenty-seven millions, doubling that of Mr. Madison's naval expenses during the war with Great Britain, when the glory of our flag of stars illuminated the ocean".

Some elements of the disinformation of the time innocently got into mainstream works, even surviving to the present day.

The fate of José Berges
The ultimate fate of José Berges, Paraguay's arbitrator and briber of Sam Ward, was not a happy one.  In the War of Paraguay against the Triple Alliance (1865-70) the country was governed by López's son, Francisco Solano.  When the war was going badly for Paraguay, José Berges, like many other prominent Paraguayans, was accused of treason.  They were arrested, brought to the town of San Fernando, severely tortured (Berges was "reduced to groveling idiocy"), forced to confess to a conspiracy that probably never existed, and shot.

Persistence
Buchanan refused to accept the arbitrators' award, arguing that they had no power to award no damages at all.  In 1861 President Lincoln sent Charles Ames Washburn to Asunción to revive the claim, but the Paraguayan government declined to reopen it.  Paraguay was ruined in the War of the Triple Alliance (1864-1870) and its archives were dispersed.  Still Hopkins did not give up.  In 1885 the U.S. government revived the claim.  In 1887 (when corruption in Paraguayan politics "was taken for granted") a minister signed a document agreeing to settle the claim for $90,000 in gold "with the previous consent and complete approval of Mr Edward A. Hopkins".  Although ratified by one house of the Paraguayan legislature, it failed to pass the other.

References

Sources

 (article in English)
 

 (article in English)

 

 (article in English)

External links
Cave Johnson's opinion in the U.S.-Paraguay arbitration
Condition of chartered steamers (reports of sea-going officers)

1850s in Paraguay
19th-century military history of the United States
History of Paraguay
1850s in the United States
1860s in the United States
James Buchanan
Military diplomacy
Paraguay–United States relations
Punitive expeditions of the United States
United States Navy in the 19th century
Combat incidents
International maritime incidents